"Blue Room" is a single by the Orb. It was released on 8 June 1992 on Big Life Records. The full 39-minute version features a number of samples, including a small portion of the beginning of "Mysterious Traveller" by Weather Report and a damaged portion of "Happy Birthday to You" by Marilyn Monroe at the end. An edited version of the song appears on the album U.F.Orb.

"Blue Room" is the longest single to ever appear on the UK Singles Chart. It entered the listing at position 12 and peaked at number eight the next week. In Ireland, the song reached number 28, and in the United States, it peaked at number 46 on the Billboard Hot Dance Club Play chart.

Background
After a number of maxi-singles had been excluded from the UK Singles Chart (or like Prince's "Gett Off" maxi-single ended up in the albums chart), the chart compilers Chart Information Network, decided to include a rule alongside the usual 25 minute maximum playing time, which allowed 'maxi singles' to run to 40 minutes if only one title was listed amongst the single's tracks. The Orb thus decided to record a 39:57 version of "Blue Room" for a special release, as there would be only one track on the single. The title "Blue Room" is a reference to the supposed Blue Room of Wright-Patterson Air Force Base, which was investigated as a possible UFO evidence-holding room.

Top of the Pops performance
The Orb caused controversy when appearing on Top of the Pops to promote the single. Instead of performing, Alex Paterson and Kris Weston, the latter holding a toy sheep, played a chess-like game whilst passing a globus cruciger back and forth. The performance had a profound impact on Robbie Williams, who later declared "that Top of the Pops changed my life".

Track listing
12-inch: Big Life / BLRT 75 (UK)
 "Blue Room (part 1)" (18:45)
 "Blue Room (part 2)" (19:01)

12-inch: Mercury / 863653-1 (US)
 "Blue Room (frank de wulf remix)" (7:37)
 "Blue Room (excerpt 606)" (10:00)
 "Assassin (oasis of rhythms mix)" (15:14)

CD: Big Life / BLRDA 75 (UK)
 "Blue Room" (39:58)

CD: Big Life / BLRDB 75 (UK)
 "Blue Room (radio 7)" (4:09)
 "Blue Room (excerpt 605)" (6:00)
 "Towers of Dub (mad professor remix)" (14:51)

CD: Logic / 74321 10702-2 (DE)
 "Blue Room (radio 7)" (4:09)
 "Blue Room" (39:57)
 "Blue Room (excerpt 605)" (6:00)
 "Towers of Dub (mad professor remix)" (14:51)

CD: Mercury / CDP 804 (US)
 "Blue Room (edit)" (3:09)
 "Blue Room (Frank De Wulf Remix)" (7:37)
 "Assassin (The Oasis of Rhythms Mix)" (15:14)
 "Blue Room (Full Length)" (40:00)

 limited edition bonus disc with the US issue of "U.F.Orb"

Charts

References

External links
 
 
 
 

The Orb songs
1992 singles
1992 songs
Big Life Records singles